= Peter the Tax-Collector =

Peter the Tax-Collector (c. 527–565) is a saint in Eastern Orthodoxy. His life is commemorated on January 20.
